Bill Radke is an American radio talk show host, web video host, author, comedian and columnist. He currently hosts Seattle's KUOW-FM's The Record and Week In Review. From November 1, 2010 to October 2012 he hosted Seattle's Morning News on KIRO-FM 97.3 with Linda Thomas in the 5AM to 9AM Pacific time slot.  

Previously he had been hosting American Public Media’s Marketplace Morning Report, a daily business/economy newscast.  He also contributed humorous news and commentary segments to KUOW's long-running show Sandy Bradley's Pot Luck, created and hosted the satire show Rewind, distributed by National Public Radio (NPR), and co-hosted the radio show Weekend America, produced by American Public Media. As a stand-up comedian, he won the 1992 Seattle International Comedy Competition. Radke authored the book Seattle and wrote a weekly humor column in the Seattle Post-Intelligencer. He lives in Seattle, Washington, with his wife, two daughters and son.

Bibliography

References

External links
 WeekendAmerica official website
 Marketplace official website
                 

Year of birth missing (living people)
Living people
American public radio personalities
American humorists
Place of birth missing (living people)